Symphyotrichum dumosum (formerly Aster dumosus) is a species of flowering plant of the family Asteraceae commonly known as rice button aster and bushy aster. It is native to much of eastern and central North America, as well as Haiti and Dominican Republic.

Description

Flowers

Symphyotrichum dumosum is a late-summer and fall blooming perennial, with flower heads opening August–October. The flower heads are about  diameter when in bloom and grow in open and much-branched paniculiform arrays. Each has many tiny florets put together into what appear as one.

Involucres and phyllaries
On the outside the flower heads of all members of the family Asteraceae are small bracts that look like scales. These are called phyllaries, and together they form the involucre that protects the individual flowers in the head before they open.

The phyllaries are appressed or slightly spreading. The shape of the outer phyllaries is oblong-oblanceolate or linear-oblanceolate, and the innermost phyllaries are linear. They are in  strongly unequal rows, meaning they are very staggered and do not end at the same point, and they are hairless.

Florets
Ray florets in the Symphyotrichum genus are exclusively female, each having a pistil (with style, stigma, and ovary) but no stamen; thus, ray florets accept pollen and each can develop a seed, but they produce no pollen.

The 15–30 disk florets start out as pale yellow and turn pink with age. Disk florets in the Symphyotrichum genus are bisexual, each with both male (stamen, anthers, and filaments) and female reproductive parts; thus, a disk floret produces pollen and can develop a seed.

Chromosomes
Symphyotrichum dumosum has a chromosome number of x = 8. Diploid and tetraploid cytotypes with respective chromosome counts of 16 and 32 have been reported.

Taxonomy
This species was long known as Aster dumosus before it was moved into its current genus due to a phylogenetic analysis performed by American botanist Guy L. Nesom. The genus Aster has been narrowed considerably in scope in recent years, due to new information about the relationships of the species in the group.

Symphyotrichum dumosum is classified in the subgenus Symphyotrichum, section Symphyotrichum, subsection Dumosi. It is one of the "bushy asters and relatives."

Infraspecies
Although the following infraspecies are no longer accepted varieties according to Catalogue of Life (COL), Plants of the World Online (POWO), and World Flora Online (WFO), they were accepted  by USDA PLANTS Database, NatureServe, and Integrated Taxonomic Information System (ITIS). The autonym is Symphyotrichum dumosum var. dumosum.

Symphyotrichum dumosum var. gracilipes 
Symphyotrichum dumosum var. pergracile 
Symphyotrichum dumosum var. strictior 
Symphyotrichum dumosum var. subulifolium

Distribution and habitat

Distribution
Symphyotrichum dumosum has a recorded native presence in the wild in the Canadian province of Ontario, and in the United States in all states east of the Mississippi River except Vermont, as well as west of the Mississippi River in Iowa, Missouri, Oklahoma, Arkansas, Texas, and Louisiana. It is also native on the Caribbean island of Hispaniola.

It is an introduced species in New Brunswick, and in the countries of Belgium, France, Great Britain, Poland, Romania, and Switzerland. It is not on the European Union's List of invasive alien species of Union concern.

Habitat
Symphyotrichum dumosum is categorized on the United States National Wetland Plant List (NWPL) with Wetland Indicator Status Rating of Facultative (FAC), choosing wetlands or non-wetlands and adjusting accordingly.

Conservation
, NatureServe lists Symphyotrichum dumosum as Secure (G5) worldwide with notation that the global status was last reviewed in 1985. Some North American province and state statuses are as follows: Presumed Extirpated (SX) in Iowa, Possibly Extirpated (SH) in Maine, Critically Imperiled (S1) in Pennsylvania, Imperiled (S2) in Ontario and Ohio, and Vulnerable (S3) in New York and Florida.

Gallery

Notes

Citations

References

dumosum
Flora of the United States
Flora of Ontario
Plants used in traditional Native American medicine
Plants described in 1753
Taxa named by Carl Linnaeus